Andrea "Anya" Davidovich (born March 24, 1997) is a former competitive pair skater. She and Evgeni Krasnopolski were the first pair representing Israel to qualify for an Olympics. They finished 15th in Sochi. Anya is currently a student at New York University studying computer science.

Early life 
Davidovich was born on March 24, 1997 in Burlington, Vermont. She was raised in New Jersey and is a dual citizen of the United States and Israel.

Career

Early career 
Prior to 2010, Davidovich was a member of Essex Skating Club in West Orange, New Jersey, USA. In 2008, she teamed up with Ivan Gyliaev, who had been training in Russia, and they skated together in the Nutcracker Theatre On Ice. They practiced together at the Essex Skating Club and placed first in Juvenile Duet at the 2009 U.S. Figure Skating National Showcase. In 2010, she became an independent member of U.S. Figure Skating.

Partnership with Krasnopolski 
Davidovich teamed up with Israeli pair skater Evgeni Krasnopolski in the spring of 2013. They were coached by Gennadi Krasnitski at the Ice House in Hackensack, New Jersey.

After training together for six months, Davidovich/Krasnopolski made their international debut at the 2013 U.S. International Classic, where they finished sixth competing for Israel. Their next event was the 2013 Nebelhorn Trophy, the final opportunity to qualify for the 2014 Olympics. By placing tenth, Davidovich/Krasnopolski earned Israel its first ever pairs' entry at an Olympics. They won the 2013 Golden Spin of Zagreb in December and then placed seventh at the 2014 European Championships in January.

Davidovich/Krasnopolski finished 15th overall at the 2014 Winter Olympics in Sochi. Their partnership ended following the Olympics and Davidovich began seeking a new partner.

Contract dispute 
Davidovich's membership of the Israel Ice Skating Federation ended in February 2014. The IISF refused requests from Davidovich, made on April 30, 2014, and from U.S. Figure Skating, to release her to compete internationally for the United States. On August 28, 2015, Bergen County, New Jersey Superior Court Judge Robert C. Wilson ordered the IISF to release Davidovich.

Later career 
Davidovich placed ninth with AJ Reiss at the 2015 U.S. Championships.

Programs 
(with Krasnopolski)

Competitive highlights

With Reiss

With Krasnopolski

References

External links 

 

Israeli female pair skaters
1997 births
Living people
Jewish American sportspeople
Figure skaters at the 2014 Winter Olympics
Olympic figure skaters of Israel
People from Livingston, New Jersey
Sportspeople from Burlington, Vermont
American sportswomen
Citizens of Israel through Law of Return
21st-century American Jews
21st-century American women